Sara Flounders is an American political writer and   has been active in progressive and anti-war organizing since the 1960s. She is a member of the Secretariat of Workers World Party, as well as a principal leader of the International Action Center. She also frequently writes for Workers World newspaper.

Flounders organized delegations to Iraq during the years when international sanctions were in place, following the 1991 Gulf War. She participated in demonstrations against U.S. presence in the Philippines and South Korea. She traveled to Sudan after Operation Infinite Reach, and to Yugoslavia during the war. She has visited Syria and Iran and organized delegations to Lebanon. She has traveled on several occasions to Gaza.

Flounders sits on the board of directors for the International Anti-imperialist Coordinating Committee, is founder and an organizer with United National Antiwar Coalition, and is Secretary of the National Board of the National Coalition to Protect Civil Freedoms. She works on legal defense efforts for Aafia Siddiqui, Lynne Stewart, Mumia Abu-Jamal, and other prisoners.

She has written in support Venezuelan diplomat Alex Saab against what she describes as unjust imprisonment and torture.

Flounders is a co-author and editor of 10 books on U.S. militarism and war. Her recent books include “Capitalism on a Ventilator – The Impact of COVID-19 in China and the U.S.”  World View Forum in 2020. The book was initially banned by Amazon, based on the title and topic, then translated and released in China. In 2023 she released the anthology: “SANCTIONS – A Wrecking Ball in a Global Economy”  World View Forum, focusing on the impact of U.S. sanctions on 40 countries, one third of the world population. (IACenter.org/sanctions-book)

Publications

References

External links 

https://www.amazon.com/Capitalism-Ventilator-Impact-COVID-19-China/dp/0895671964

 

https://www.coha.org/sanctions-a-wrecking-ball-in-a-global-economy/

 

https://hollywoodprogressive.com/literature/sanctions

 
 War Without Victory book website

Living people
American women in politics
American communists
American anti-war activists
Workers World Party politicians
Year of birth missing (living people)